The North Texas League was a Class D level minor baseball league that played during the 1905 and 1907 seasons. The league featured teams based in Arkansas and Texas.

History 

The 1905 North Texas League consisted of four charter teams, initially all from Texas. They were the Paris Parasites, of Paris, the Greenville Midlands of Greenville, an un-nicknamed team from Clarksville and an un-nicknamed team from Texarkana. Partway through the year, the Paris club moved to Hope, Arkansas, making it the only non-Texas city to be represented in the league. Clarksville disbanded on July 21 after going 34–42, while Texarcana - with a 36–46 record - disbanded on August 2, forcing the league to disband on August 6, 1905. The Parasites finished first in the league with a 48–32 record, while the Midlands had a 41–40 record. Dode Criss and Clyde Milan played in the league that year. 

The North Texas League did not play in 1906.

Reformed in 1907, the North Texas League featured the Corsicana Oilers/Desperados of Corsicana, Paris Athletics, Greenville Hunters and Terrell Red Stockings of Terrell. Corsicana finished first in the league with a 38–21 record, while Paris was 36–23, Greenville was 24–35 and Terrell was 18–38. Greenville folded on June 28, 1907, causing the league to cease operations on June 30, 1907. Notable players include Hippo Vaughn. and Bill Yohe.

Cities represented  
 Clarksville, TX: Clarksville 1905
 Corsicana, TX: Corsicana Oilers / Corsicana Desperados 1907
 Greenville, TX: Greenville Midlands 1905; Greenville Hunters 1907
 Hope, AR: Hope 1905 
 Paris, TX: Paris Parisites 1905;  Paris Athletics 1907 
 Terrell, TX: Terrell Red Stockings 1907
 Texarkana, TX: Texarkana 1905

Standings & statistics

1905 North Texas League
Paris (5–2) in the second half, moved to Hope July 20;Clarksville disbanded July 31;Texarcana disbanded August 2, causing the league to disband August 6.

1907 North Texas League
schedule
Greenville disbanded June 28, causing the league to disband June 30.

References

Defunct minor baseball leagues in the United States
Baseball leagues in Texas
Sports leagues established in 1905
1905 establishments in Texas
1907 disestablishments in Texas
Sports leagues disestablished in 1907